Cnemaspis pagai is a species of gecko endemic to South Pagai in Indonesia.

References

Cnemaspis
Reptiles of Indonesia
Reptiles described in 2017